Robert Caskin Prince III, known professionally as Bobby Prince, is an American video game composer and sound designer. He has worked as an independent contractor for several gaming companies, most notably id Software and 3D Realms. Some of his most notable works include Wolfenstein 3D, Doom, Doom II: Hell on Earth, Duke Nukem II, and Duke Nukem 3D.

Early life and education

Bobby Prince was a founding member of R&B and soul band The Jesters. He was a 1LT platoon leader in Vietnam 1969–70.

Prince is a lawyer who passed the bar in 1980.

Career
Prince has created music and sound effects for Commander Keen 4–6, Cosmo's Cosmic Adventure, Pickle Wars, Catacomb 3D, Wolfenstein 3D, Spear of Destiny, Blake Stone, Rise of the Triad, Duke Nukem II, Duke Nukem 3D, Abuse, Demonstar, and many other games.

Among his most notable and most enduring works is the soundtrack to the video game Doom. The Doom soundtrack grew very popular among gamers, with fans doing various cover versions and remix projects more than 20 years after the game's release. According to John Romero, a co-developer of Doom, several tracks from the game are copies of songs from popular heavy metal bands, such as Pantera and Alice in Chains.

In 2006, he was given a Lifetime Achievement Award by his fellow game composers.

His latest works include sound and music for the game Wrack (formerly Last Bastion).

Discography

See also
IMF (file format)

References

External links
bobby prince Music Entry Point – Official website
Artist profile at OverClocked ReMix

Living people
Year of birth missing (living people)
United States Army personnel of the Vietnam War
Place of birth missing (living people)
United States Army officers
Video game composers